Lü Peng (born 28 October 1989) is a Chinese footballer who plays as midfielder for Dalian Professional.

Club career
At the beginning of the 2008 season, Lü would break into the senior team of Dalian Shide after graduating from their youth team. He would make his debut senior appearance for Dalian with his youth teammate Yang Boyu on 25 June 2008 against Liaoning FC in a 2–1 win. As a promising midfielder, Lü would play in several more games for Dalian during the season and was one of the few bright aspects in a disappointing season for the club which saw Dalian flirt with relegation. After surviving relegation, the club would introduce Xu Hong as their new club manager and he would over overhaul the entire squad with many of youngsters that were tried out in the previous season, being one these youngsters Lü gained significant playing time and would aid Dalian to an eighth-place finish at the end of the 2009 season. The next season would see teammate and Chinese international Zhao Xuri move to Shaanxi Renhe, which allowed Lü to be permanently promoted as the club's first choice starter in midfield.

At the beginning of the 2013 season, Dalian Shide were taken over by their top tier rivals Dalian Aerbin and Lü would be part of the squad that transferred to the newly enlarged Dalian Aerbin squad. Unfortunately for him, the merger saw his new club exceed the Chinese Football Association's rules on their quota of how many transfers each club was allowed to have, which saw Lü dropped to the club's reserve's until after the summer transfer window opened and he eventually made his debut for the club on 6 July 2013 in a league game against Shandong Luneng that ended in a 1–1 draw. The following season would see him be part of the team that was relegated at the end of the 2014 Chinese Super League campaign.

On 30 January 2015, Lü transferred to China League One side Beijing Enterprises. He would revive his career and he would go on to establish himself as integral member of the team. After two seasons he moved to Chinese Super League side Beijing Guoan on 19 January 2017. He would make his debut for them in a league game on 29 April 2017 against Liaoning F.C. in a game that ended in a 4-2 victory. The following season he would establish himself as a regular within the team and help the club to go on to the win the 2018 Chinese FA Cup against Shandong Luneng. After four seasons he would join fellow top tier club Qingdao on 24 March 2021. He would be part of the team that was relegated at the end of the 2021 Chinese Super League campaign. The club would be subsequently dissolved due to financial difficulties on 13 April 2022.

On 21 April 2022 he joined top tier club Dalian Professional for the start of the 2022 Chinese Super League season. He made  his debut in a league game on 4 June 2022 against Henan Songshan Longmen in a match that ended in a 2-2 draw. He would go on to establish himself as a vital member of the team and score his first goal for the club in a league game on 13 November 2022 against  Guangzhou F.C. in a 1-1 draw.

International career
Lü was called up to the Chinese national team by the Chinese Head coach Gao Hongbo and played against Costa Rica on 26 March 2011 where he would start the game and help guide the team to a 2–2 draw.

Career statistics

Club statistics
.

International statistics

Honours

Club
Beijing Guoan
Chinese FA Cup: 2018.

References

External links 
 
 
 Player profile at sodasoccer.com
 Player stats at sohu.com

1989 births
Living people
Chinese footballers
Footballers from Dalian
China international footballers
Dalian Shide F.C. players
Dalian Professional F.C. players
Beijing Sport University F.C. players
Beijing Guoan F.C. players
Chinese Super League players
China League One players
Footballers at the 2010 Asian Games
Association football midfielders
Asian Games competitors for China